Puoti is an Italian surname. Notable people with the surname include:

Basilio Puoti (1782–1847), Italian literary critic, lexicographer, and grammarian
Giovanni Puoti (born 1944), Italian rector and politician

Italian-language surnames